MF  Jadran is a ro-ro vehicle and passenger ferry owned and operated by Jadrolinija, the Croatian state-owned ferry company. She was built in 2010 by the Brodosplit shipyard in Split, Croatia. As of June 2010 she serves on the Split—Stari Grad route.

MF Jadran is a Hull 515 class ferry, along with her twin, the MV Biokovo, which was also built at Brodosplit in July 2009. These two ferries were commissioned as part of Jadrolinija's fleet renewal program, which (as of June 2010) include a total of eight newly built ships since 2004. These including two other Hull 515 class ferries, the MF Hrvat and MF Juraj Dalmatinac which had been built by the Kraljevica shipyard and delivered in 2007.

References

External links

Zaplovio trajekt Jadran at Agencija-ZOLPP.hr 

Ferries of Croatia
Ships built in Croatia
2010 ships